The Golden Gophers accumulated an overall record of 30–4–2, and a 19–3–2 WCHA record in the 2003–04 campaign. The Golden Gophers swept the WCHA honors, winning the regular season championship and the WCHA Final Five with a 4–2 win over state rivals Minnesota-Duluth.

Regular season
The Gophers went undefeated in the first half of the season, posting a 13–0–1 record. The Golden Gophers were the top team in the country for 18 of the 23 weeks in both the U.S. College Hockey Online and USA Today polls.

Postseason
On March 28, 2004 Halldorson and the Golden Gophers defeated Harvard, 6–2, to win their first NCAA Championship and her third national championship in six years.

Awards and honors
Laura Halldorson, American Hockey Coaches Association’s Coach of the Year, her third honor since 1998.

References

Minnesota
Minnesota Golden Gophers women's ice hockey seasons
NCAA women's ice hockey Frozen Four seasons
NCAA women's ice hockey championship seasons
Minn
Minne
Minne